Andrew Wessels (born 13 May 1974) is a South African cricketer. He played in nine first-class and six List A matches from 1991/92 to 1996/97.

References

External links
 

1974 births
Living people
South African cricketers
Boland cricketers
Free State cricketers
Cricketers from Pietermaritzburg